Hanuš of Lipá was a Bohemian nobleman and landowner.

Biography
Hanuš was the third son of Henry III of Lipá. He is first documented in 1397.

Hanuš, his father, and his brothers were placed in charge of Rataje nad Sázavou after the death of Jan Ješek Ptáček of Pirkštein. The heir of Rataje nad Sázavou, Jan Ptáček of Pirkstein, was not yet of age. In 1403, Hanuš welcomed Racek Kobyla of Dvorce and some survivors of the attack by Sigismund of Hungary on Stříbrná Skalice into Rataje nad Sázavou.

Hanuš was often in debt, and so from his seat in Rataje nad Sázavou orchestrated attacks on the royal estates. This earned him a reputation as a robber knight.

On 1 February 1412 Hanuš was ordered to pass his holdings to Jan Ptáček of Pirkstein, the rightful heir, though he remained in control of the village of Senohraby. In 1415, he was noted as being Supreme Marshal of the Kingdom of Bohemia. He died later that year.

In popular culture
Sir Hanush of Leipa, a character in the 2018 video game Kingdom Come: Deliverance, is based on Hanuš. He was voiced by Peter Hosking.

References

Medieval Bohemian nobility
15th-century Bohemian people
Date of birth unknown